In Bruges is a 2008 British-American black comedy film written and directed by Martin McDonagh. The film stars Colin Farrell and Brendan Gleeson as two Irish hitmen in hiding, with Ralph Fiennes as their gangster boss. The film takes place—and was filmed—in the Belgian city of Bruges. The film opened on limited release in the United States on 8 February 2008. It premiered at the Jameson Dublin International Film Festival on 15 February 2008, and later went on full release in Ireland on 8 March 2008. The film opened 18 April 2008, in the United Kingdom.

In Bruges was nominated for seven awards by the British Independent Film Awards, including the Douglas Hickox Award (Debut Director), Best Performance by an Actor in a British Independent Film and Best Screenplay, the latter of which it won. It was also nominated for two Satellite Awards: for Best Actor (Brendan Gleeson) and Best Film.

The film was also nominated for the Golden Globe Award for Best Motion Picture – Musical or Comedy, and both Brendan Gleeson and Colin Farrell were nominated for Best Actor – Motion Picture Musical or Comedy, which Farrell won at the 66th Golden Globe Awards ceremony, broadcast on 11 January 2009. McDonagh won the Best Original Screenplay award at the 62nd British Academy Film Awards in February 2009.

The film was nominated for Best Original Screenplay award at the 81st Academy Awards in 2009, but lost to Milk. In the same year, it won the Best International Film award at the 6th Irish Film & Television Awards.

Awards and nominations

See also
2008 in film

References

External links
 

Lists of accolades by film